Cem Toraman (born 11 April 1983), better known as Summer Cem, is a German rapper of Turkish descent. He is known for frequent collaborations, particularly with KC Rebell and others.

He has had seven albums with three topping the German albums chart, solo album Cemesis in 2016, and joint album Maximum with KC Rebell in 2017 and Endstufe in 2018.

Discography

Albums

Collaborative albums

Singles

Featured in

Other charted songs

References

1983 births
Living people
German people of Turkish descent
German rappers